Angaaray is a 1975 Bollywood film directed by Govind Saraiya. It stars Sanjeev Kumar & Raakhee in lead roles.

Songs
All songs were penned by Anand Bakshi.

"Ankhiyon Se Tumne Nindiya Luti" - Mohammed Rafi
"Dar Lagta Hai" - Lata Mangeshkar
"Tang Main Aa Gayaa Hun Javaani Se" - Kishore Kumar, Asha Bhosle
"Ladki Gali Ki Le Gayi Dekho Mera Dil" - Mohammed Rafi, Asha Bhosle

External links
 

1977 films
1970s Hindi-language films
Films scored by Chitragupta